Mark L. and Harriet E. Monteith House was a historic home located at Elkhart, Elkhart County, Indiana.  It was built around 1908, and was a two-story, "T" shaped, frame dwelling which was remodeled in the Tudor Revival style in the 1930s. It featured a steeply pitched roof, two-story porch, and brick and half-timbering on the exterior. It has been demolished.

It was added to the National Register of Historic Places in 1985.

References

Houses on the National Register of Historic Places in Indiana
Tudor Revival architecture in Indiana
Houses completed in 1908
Houses in Elkhart County, Indiana
National Register of Historic Places in Elkhart County, Indiana
Buildings and structures in Elkhart, Indiana
1908 establishments in Indiana